Sidney Herbert Ray (28 May 1858 – 1 January 1939) was a British comparative and descriptive linguist who specialised in Melanesian languages.

In 1892, he read an important paper, The Languages of British New Guinea, to the Ninth International Congress of Orientalists. In that paper, he established the distinction between the Austronesian and Papuan languages of New Guinea. Although he never held an academic position, and was employed throughout his working life as a school teacher, S. H. Ray was an energetic fieldworker, and participated in a number of expeditions.

His first fieldwork was carried out as part of A. C. Haddon's 1898 Torres Straits Expedition along with W. H. R. Rivers, C. G. Seligman and Anthony Wilkin. At the time Ray was a primary school teacher, who had already made a study of two Torres Straits languages on the basis of missionary publications and data supplied by Haddon.

References

Archives
The papers of Sidney Herbert Ray (PP MS 3) are held at SOAS Archives

1858 births
1939 deaths
Linguists from the United Kingdom
Linguists of Papuan languages
Linguists of Austronesian languages